Kurraba Point ferry wharf is located on the northern side of Sydney Harbour serving the Sydney suburb of Kurraba Point.

Wharves & services
Kurraba Point wharf is served by Sydney Ferries Neutral Bay services operated by First Fleet class ferries.

References

External links
 Kurraba Point Wharf at Transport for New South Wales (Archived 12 June 2019)
Kurraba Point Local Area Map Transport for NSW

Ferry wharves in Sydney